This is a list of the municipalities in the province of León, in the autonomous community of Castile and León, Spain.

See also

Geography of Spain
List of cities in Spain

 
Leon